Kofola is a carbonated soft drink produced by the eponymous Czech company, which is headquartered in Ostrava, Czech Republic. It is the principal rival of Coca-Cola and Pepsi in the Czech Republic and Slovakia. The company is one of the leading soft drink producers and distributors in Central and Eastern Europe.

History 

Kofola originated in the Czechoslovak Research Institute of Medicinal Plants in Prague in 1959, during research targeted at finding a possible use for surplus caffeine produced in the process of coffee roasting. The resulting dark-coloured, sweet-and-sour syrup Kofo became the main ingredient of a new soft drink named Kofola, introduced in 1960. During the 1960s and 1970s, Kofola became exceedingly popular in communist Czechoslovakia, successfully competing with Western cola drinks like Coca-Cola or Pepsi, which were generally available after 1968 (Pepsi in 1974), but were expensive and considered as for high society. Even today, Kofola is a popular option in restaurants as it can be draught-poured from kegs right into a glass.

Since 1998, Kofola has been bottled (in addition to classic 0.33-litre glass bottles) in 0.5-litre and 2-litre plastic bottles. 0.25-litre cans were introduced in 2003, and 1-litre plastic-bottles in December 2004. Kofola draught from 50-litre kegs, traditionally sold in many bars and restaurants across the two countries, remains popular as well.

Since 2002 the producer has run a successful media campaign aimed at a young and hip audience based on the slogan "Když ji miluješ, není co řešit / Keď ju miluješ, nie je čo riešiť" ("If you love it, there is nothing to question"). Until 2000, the Kofola logo featured a coffee bean. It now resembles a coffee flower.

Company 

After the fall of the communist regime in 1989, Kofola had to compete with many foreign brands that entered the new open market. After a period of decline and trademark lawsuits (many companies produced their own similar-tasting "kofola" because the term became a genericized trademark), in 2000 the Santa nápoje company, owned by the Greek-immigrant Samaras family, became the only producer and distributor of Kofola in the Czech Republic and Slovakia. Other producers of similar drinks had to rename their products (most notable Slovakian Hejkola and Šofocola).

The company Santa nápoje originally produced Kofola drink only in the parent factory in Krnov. In 2002, the company built a new factory in Rajecká Lesná, Slovakia, to satisfy the demand of the Slovak market. In 2003, Santa nápoje changed its name to Kofola, a.s. and later to Kofola ČeskoSlovensko a.s. Apart from Kofola it also produces other soft drinks, the spring water Rajec, the fresh fruit juices UGO, the syrups Jupí and children's drink Jupík, RC Cola under license and from 2008 the grape drink Vinea, that are exported to Poland, Hungary, Slovakia and Croatia.

In 2008, Kofola announced a merger with the Polish lemonade producer Hoop. In autumn 2008, the Polish Private Equity fund Enterprise Investors acquired in a Public Tender Offer 42.46% of Kofola-Hoop for approximately €140 million. In 2009, the Polish company Kofola-Hoop S.A. was renamed into Kofola S.A.

In April 2009, Kofola acquired Pinelli and since then has produced the energy drink Semtex. In 2010, Kofola opened a new factory in Mnichovo Hradiště. In December 2014, Kofola bought Slovenian factory for mineral water Radenska.

At the end of 2018, the Kofola Group operated in the Czech Republic, Slovakia, Poland, Slovenia, Croatia, Russia, Austria and Hungary.

Ingredients 
Kofo syrup, the main ingredient of Kofola, consists of 14 herbal and fruit ingredients (such as extracts from apple, cherry, currant, or herbal aroma), sugar and/or high fructose corn syrup (2014), and caramel. In contrast with Pepsi or Coca-Cola, it contains 30% less sugar, ~56% more caffeine (15 mg/100ml, Coca-Cola 9.6 mg/100ml) and does not contain phosphoric acid.

Products

 Kofola Original – original distributed in 0.5 L, 1 L, 1.5 L, 2 L plastic bottles, in 0.25 L and 0.33 L glass, in 0.25 L cans and also in kegs. 
 Kofola Citrus – with a hint of lemon, it was introduced in 2004, distributed in plastic bottles
 Kofola Bez Cukru – sugar-free alternative was introduced in 2008, available in plastic bottles
 Kofola Višňová – sour cherry-flavoured Kofola introduced in 2008, available in plastic bottles and cans
 Kofola Vanilka – vanilla-flavoured Kofola introduced in 2013, available in plastic bottles
 Kofola Guarana – energy drink with Kofola and guarana-flavor introduced in 2013, available in plastic bottles and cans
 Kofola Meruňka – apricot-flavoured Kofola introduced in 2015, available in plastic bottles
 Kofola Meloun – watermelon-flavoured Kofola introduced in 2016, available in plastic bottles
 Kofola Černý Rybíz – blackcurrant-flavoured Kofola introduced in 2017, available in plastic bottles and cans
 Kofola Malina – raspberry-flavoured Kofola introduced in 2017, available in plastic bottles
 Kofola Ostružina – blackberry-flavoured Kofola introduced in 2018, available in plastic bottles
 Kofola Ananas – pineapple-flavoured Kofola introduced in 2018, available in cans
 Kofola Grep – grapefruit-flavoured Kofola introduced in 2018, available in cans
 Kofola Angrešt – gooseberry-flavoured Kofola introduced in 2019, available in plastic bottles

A Christmas limited edition with a hint of cinnamon was introduced at the end of 2007, and was only available around the Christmas period. In 2011–2016 was sold another variant of the drink called Kofola Extra Herbal, it was extended with dandelion, gentian and peppermint. Other flavours introduced in limited editions include: cherry, pomegranate, almond, gingerbread, chocolate, coconut, walnut, plum, pear and mandarin.  A 2019 Christmas edition is with a hint of apple and a bit of cinnamon.

Cocktails 
The most popular cocktail with kofola is a highball made of kofola, Czech Tuzemák (domestic rum) and lemon juice called Kofrum, Handlová Libre, Student lemonade, Rebel or Chequia Libre. Kofola with pilsner lager beer is called Kofola 'n' Beer or Diesel.

References

External links 

 Czech homepage
 Slovak homepage

Cola-like brands
Czech brands
Czech drinks
Krnov
Products introduced in 1960
Slovak drinks
Soft drinks manufacturers
Caffeinated soft drinks